Adam O. Zyglis (born July 9, 1982) is a Pulitzer Prize-winning American editorial cartoonist who works for the Buffalo News of Buffalo, New York, where he replaced fellow Pulitzer Prize–winner Tom Toles, when Toles became the cartoonist for The Washington Post. Zyglis is also nationally syndicated through Cagle Cartoons, Inc. He has also done freelance work and caricatures and cartoons for the weekly alternative Artvoice. Zyglis has won awards from the Associated College Press, and the Universal Press Syndicate, and has been nominated for several other national cartooning awards. He placed third in the 2007 and 2011 National Headliner Awards. In 2013, he won the Clifford K. and James T. Berryman Award, given by the National Press Foundation. Zyglis was awarded the 2015 Pulitzer Prize for Editorial Cartooning for using, in the committee's citation, "strong images to connect with readers while conveying layers of meaning in few words. "

Zyglis graduated from Canisius College in 2004 with a Bachelor of Science in Computer Science and Math. He was Art Director and cartoonist for The Griffin, Canisius's student newspaper. His work for The Griffin won him three national collegiate cartooning awards.

References

External links
Adamzyglis.com
Lambiek Comiclopedia article.

1982 births
Living people
American editorial cartoonists
Artists from Buffalo, New York
Canisius College alumni
Pulitzer Prize for Editorial Cartooning winners
The Buffalo News Pulitzer Prize winners